The Program (working title Icon) is a 2015 biographical drama film about Lance Armstrong directed by Stephen Frears, starring Ben Foster as Armstrong and Chris O'Dowd as journalist David Walsh.

The film is based on Walsh's 2012 book Seven Deadly Sins. It premiered at the 2015 Toronto International Film Festival on 14 September 2015 and was theatrically released in France on 16 September and the United Kingdom on 14 October.

Cast

 Ben Foster as Lance Armstrong
 Chris O'Dowd as David Walsh
 Guillaume Canet as Michele Ferrari
 Jesse Plemons as Floyd Landis
 Lee Pace as Bill Stapleton
 Denis Menochet as Johan Bruyneel
 Dustin Hoffman as Bob Hamman
 Edward Hogg as Frankie Andreu
 Elaine Cassidy as Betsy Andreu
 Laura Donnelly as Emma O'Reilly
 Sam Hoare as Stephen Swart
 Kevin Hulsmans as Filippo Simeoni
 John Schwab as Travis Tygart
 Lucien Guignard as Alberto Contador
 Nicolas Robin as Christophe Bassons
 James Harkness as Wayne
 Josh O'Connor as Rich
 Nathan Wiley as Charles Pelkey

Production

Development
Director Stephen Frears had the idea to make a film about Lance Armstrong after reading a review of Tyler Hamilton's book, The Secret Race. Unable to acquire the rights for Hamilton's book, he instead settled on Walsh's Seven Deadly Sins. Frears then turned to screenwriter John Hodge to write the script, partly because of Hodge's experience as a doctor.

Hodge has said that he primarily based his screenplay on Seven Deadly Sins, in addition to other journalism and affidavits from cyclists. Hodge says he ruled out using Armstrong's own accounts of his behavior during this period, and that scenes shown from Armstrong's perspective are fiction.

Casting
Lee Pace joined the cast in November 2013. Dustin Hoffman joined the cast in December 2013.

To better understand his role, Foster took performance-enhancing drugs while shooting the film.

Filming
Principal photography began in October 2013.

Reception

Box office
The Program grossed $3.3 million worldwide.  It was released for U.S. rental on DirecTV on 19 February 2016, with a cinema release on 18 March 2016.

Critical response
On Rotten Tomatoes, the film has a rating of 62%, based on 112 reviews, with an average rating of 6/10. The site's critical consensus reads, "Ben Foster's impressive efforts to channel Lance Armstrong are often enough to power The Program past director Stephen Frears' frustrating unwillingness to delve deeper into its real-life story." On Metacritic, the film has a score of 53 out of 100, based on 20 critics, indicating "mixed or average reviews".

References

External links
 
 
 Official trailer

2015 films
English-language French films
2015 biographical drama films
British biographical drama films
French biographical drama films
Cycling films
Films about doping
Films directed by Stephen Frears
Films produced by Eric Fellner
Films produced by Tim Bevan
Films scored by Alex Heffes
Films shot in Austin, Texas
Films shot in Belgium
Films shot in France
Films shot in Paris
Lance Armstrong
Films with screenplays by John Hodge
Tour de France mass media
StudioCanal films
Working Title Films films
Doping at the Tour de France
Biographical films about sportspeople
Cultural depictions of cyclists
Cultural depictions of American men
2015 drama films
2010s English-language films
2010s British films
2010s French films